"I Get Lifted" is a song recorded by American singer Barbara Tucker, who co-wrote it with producer Little Louie Vega. The song was released in 1994 and became Tucker's second of seven number-one singles on the US Billboard Hot Dance Club Play chart, reaching the top spot on January 28, 1995. On the UK Singles Chart, the single peaked at 33 in 1995. It was re-released with a new remix package in 2009.

Critical reception
Larry Flick from Billboard wrote, "Tucker follows her massive "Beautiful People" with a similar house mover. She belts words of increased spirituality and unity with earnest conviction, matching the energy of the groove with ease." He added, "The stylistic influence of producer Louie Vega is evident. He weaves a kickin' rhythm base that both DJs and punters will find infectious." Maria Jimenez from Music & Media described it as "another highly charged, positivity track" and "ideal crossover dance music". Andy Beevers from Music Week gave it four out of five, noting that the singer returns with a "strident garage track". He also stated that "it is destined to be a big clubland tune that could cross over." James Hamilton from the RM Dance Update deemed it a "gospel cliches inspired diva's 'Little' Louie Vegas produced bounder".

Track listings

 12 inch (US)
A1. "I Get Lifted" (The Unreleased Mix) – 6:30  
A2. "I Get Lifted" (F.O.S. Dream Vocal Mix) – 5:35  
B. "I Get Lifted" (Armand's Get Deep Mix) – 9:15

 CD maxi (Australia)
"I Get Lifted" (Loveland's High On Life Radio Edit) – 3:29  
"I Get Lifted" (Original Radio Edit) – 4:16  
"I Get Lifted" (Boyd Slam The Organ Mix) – 6:34  
"I Get Lifted" (Loveland's High On Life Mix) – 7:02  
"I Get Lifted" (Underground Network Mix) – 7:10  
"I Get Lifted" (Go To Church Mix) – 6:50

 I Get Lifted 2009
"I Get Lifted" (Bob Sinclar Remix) – 8:18
"I Get Lifted" (David Tort Remix) – 8:26
"I Get Lifted" (The Underground Network Mix) – 7:11
"I Get Lifted" (Dub Beats) – 5:57
"I Get Lifted" (Armands Lift Me Up Mix) - Extra CD Track – 7:58
"I Get Lifted" (The Bar Dub) - Extra CD Track – 6:23
"I Get Lifted" (Boyd Slams The Organ Mix) - Extra CD Track – 6:33
"I Get Lifted" (Go To Church) - Extra CD Track – 6:50
"I Get Lifted" (XTC Mix) - Extra CD Track – 3:30

Charts

References

External links
Live performance of "I Get Lifted" on YouTube

1994 singles
1994 songs
American house music songs
Barbara Tucker songs
House music songs